Aditi Chengappa is an Indian actress, who appears in Telugu, Tamil, Hindi and Hollywood cinema.

Early life
Aditi was born in Bangalore. Her father, Raj Chengappa, an Arebashe Gowda from Karnataka, is the editorial director of publishing The India Today Group (Noida), while her mother, Usha Chengappa, a Tamilian, is the Delhi Centre Head at Bharat Thakur's Artistic Yoga. She is related to Rukmini Devi Arundale, an Indian theosophist, dancer and choreographer of the Indian classical dance form of Bharatnatyam, and Carnatic musician and playback singer D. K. Pattammal, both being her great grand aunts.

Aditi studied at Vasant Valley School and then at Lady Shri Ram College in Delhi. She has been trained in both Hindustani classical and western vocals. She is also an accomplished pianist, representing both school and college. She has stated "Music was my only passion till I became interested in acting. Music remains my first love". She is a big fan of yoga and a gaming freak. When she was in college, she hosted a health show, "Bodylicious" on NDTV Good Times, with her mother Usha Chengappa .

Career
She made her film debut in Telugu film Thakita Thakita. Her Tamil debut Konjam Koffee Konjam Kaadhal never had a theatrical release. She has completed a Hindi film, titled X, which is directed by 11 filmmakers. She is shooting for Gunasekhar's Telugu 3D period-drama Rudhramadevi, in which she plays Rudrama Devi's sister Ganapamba. She has also signed two new Tamil projects, a science fiction film titled Ra and a romantic comedy, Moone Moonu Vaarthai.

Filmography

References

External links
 

Actresses in Telugu cinema
Actresses in Tamil cinema
21st-century Indian actresses
Indian film actresses
Actresses from Bangalore
Living people
Year of birth missing (living people)
Actresses in Hindi cinema